The following is a list of notable deaths in August 1997.

Entries for each day are listed alphabetically by surname. A typical entry lists information in the following sequence:
 Name, age, country of citizenship at birth, subsequent country of citizenship (if applicable), reason for notability, cause of death (if known), and reference.

August 1997

1
Ángel Acuña, 78, Mexican basketball player.
Kenneth W. Bilby, 78, American RCA executive, leukemia.
Berta Alves de Sousa, 91, Portuguese pianist and composer.
Ngiratkel Etpison, 72, Palau politician.
Lawrence Alexander Sidney Johnson, 72, Australian taxonomic botanist, cancer.
Norio Nagayama, 48, Japanese spree killer and novelist, execution by hanging.
Sviatoslav Richter, 82, Ukrainian pianist, heart attack.
Janet G. Travell, 95, American physician and medical researcher, heart failure.
Hans von Luck, 86, German Wehrmacht officer during World War II.

2
William S. Burroughs, 83, American author (Naked Lunch, Junkie) and visual artist, heart attack.
John Churcher, 91, British army general.
Antonis Daglis, Greek serial killer, suicide.
Joyce Dingwell, 89, Australian writer.
Feim Ibrahimi, 61, Albanian composer.
Harald Kihle, 92, Norwegian painter and illustrator.
James Krüss, 71, German children's author and illustrator.
Fela Kuti, 58, Nigerian musician and human rights activist, AIDS (disputed).
Frank E. Smith, 79, American politician, complications from strokes.
Ricardo Muñoz Suay, 79, Spanish film director, producer and screenwriter.
Michèle Pujol, 46, French intellectual, feminist, and human rights activist, cancer.
Rhydwen Williams, 80, Welsh poet, novelist and baptist minister.

3
Peter A. Carruthers, 62, American physicist.
Joan Erikson, 94, Austrian-Canadian author, educator, and dance ethnographer.
Mladen Koščak, 60, Croatian football player.
Pietro Rizzuto, 63, Canadian politician.
Nirmal Chandra Sinha, 85–86, Indian tibetologist and author.

4
Horace Bristol, 88, American photographer.
Dick Bush, 65, British cinematographer (Tommy, Victor Victoria, Twins of Evil).
Jeanne Calment, 122, French supercentenarian and the oldest person ever documented in history, senility.
Tom Eckersley, 82, English poster artist and teacher of design.
Nicholas J. Hoff, 91, Hungarian-American aeronautics and astronautic engineer.
Gene Johnson, 61, American gridiron football player.
Lloyd Marshall, 83, American light heavyweight boxer.
Ariel Maughan, 74, American basketball player.
Ray Renfro, 67, American gridiron football player.
Sidney Simon, 80, American painter, sculptor, and muralist.
Alexander Young, 58, Scottish musician, lung cancer.

5
Clarence M. Kelley, 85, American politician and director of the FBI.
Poul Møller, 77, Danish Conservative People's Party politician.
Don Steele, 61, American disc jockey, lung cancer.
Michael J. Tully Jr., 64, American lawyer and politician, heart attack.

6
Lance Barnard, 78, Australian politician and diplomat.
Maria Antonietta Beluzzi, 67, Italian actress, infarction.
Birendra Kumar Bhattacharya, 72, Indian writer.
Shin Ki-ha, 56, South Korean politician, aviation accident.
Jürgen Kuczynski, 92, German economist and communist.
Tom Normanton, 80, British politician.
John Porter, 93, Canadian ice hockey player.
Samuel Paul Welles, 89, American palaeontologist.
Bora Öztürk, 42, Turkish football player, cancer.

7
Rudolf Blügel, 70, German politicianand member of the Bundestag.
Jules Goedhuys, 92, Belgian racing cyclist.
Kay Halle, 93, American journalist, author and World War II OSS operative.
Elisabeth Höngen, 90, German operatic mezzo-soprano and actress.
Volker Prechtel, 55, German actor, cancer.

8
Joseph Aquilina, 78, Maltese author and linguist.
Orville H. Hampton, 80, American screenwriter.
Dardanelle Hadley, 79, American jazz musician.
Plato Malozemoff, 87, Russian-American engineer and businessman, congestive heart failure.
Paul Rudolph, 78, American architect, peritoneal mesothelioma.

9
Doug Adams, 47, American gridiron football player.
Max Bloesch, 89, Swiss field handball player and Olympian.
Gabriel Cattand, 73, French actor.
Herbert de Souza, 61, American sociologist and activist, AIDS-related complications.
Ilpo Koskela, 52, Finnish ice hockey player.
Trần Đại Nghĩa, 83, Vietnamese scientist and military engineer.

10
Peter Braestrup, 66–67, American journalist, heart attack.
Valery Chaptynov, 52, Russian politician.
Roy Chipman, 40, American basketball coach, colorectal cancer.
Malú Gatica, 75, Chilean actress and singer.
William Jordy, 80, American architectural historian.
Steve Kraftcheck, 68, Canadian ice hockey player.
Jean-Claude Lauzon, 43, Canadian filmmaker and screenwriter, aviation accident.
Carlton Moss, 88, American screenwriter, actor and film director.
Conlon Nancarrow, 84, American-Mexican composer.
Bob Welborn, 69, American racing driver.
George Zames, 63, Polish-Canadian control theorist and professor.

11
Miksa Bondi, 79, Hungarian boxer.
Bert McTaggart, 81, Australian rules footballer.
Frank Pearson, 77, American Negro league baseball player.
Jacques Robert, 76, French author, screenwriter and journalist.

12
Luther Allison, 57, American blues guitarist, cancer.
Anna Balakian, 82, Armenian-American professor of comparative literature, congestive heart failure.
Rex Barney, 72, American baseball player.
Gösta Bohman, 86, Swedish politician.
Jack Delano, 83, American photographer, kidney failure.
Keith Harper, 70, Australian rules football player.
Robert Hetzron, 58, Hungarian-born linguist.
Gulshan Kumar, 41, Indian businessman and film producer, murdered.
Dick Marx, 73, American jazz pianist and arranger, car accident.
Mario Montuori, 77, Italian film cinematographer and painter.
Abe Newborn, 77, American talent agent and theatre producer, congestive heart failure.
Sam Nolutshungu, 52, South African academic, cancer.
Len Norris, 83, Canadian editorial cartoonist.
Achilles Papapetrou, 90, Greek theoretical physicist.
Albert L. Smith, Jr., 65, American politician.
Conrad von Molo, 90, Austrian film producer and editor.
Ali Yata, 76, Moroccan communist leader.

13
Vladimir Gribov, 67, Soviet and Russian theoretical physicist.
Robert L. Leggett, 71, American politician.
Dick Mather, 56, Canadian politician, heart attack.
Emil Mosbacher, 75, American yachtsman and Chief of Protocol of the United States, cancer.
Harlow Rothert, 89, American Olympic shot putter.
Marjorie Lynette Sigley, 68, English artist, writer, actress, choreographer and theatre director, cancer.
Carel Weight, 88, English painter.

14
John Elliot, 79, British novelist, screenwriter and television producer.
Charlie Fleming, 70, Scottish footballer.
Diana E. Forsythe, 49, American anthropology researcher, hiking accident.
Frederick Carl Galda, 79, American attorney and politician.
George Pfister, 78, American baseball player and coach, heart attack.
Guido Vincenzi, 65, Italian football player and manager, A.L.S.

15
Ida Gerhardt, 92, Dutch writer and poet.
Ray Heatherton, 88, American singer, Broadway performer and television personality, Alzheimer's disease.
Lubka Kolessa, 95, Canadian-Ukrainian pianist and educator.
Lawrence Morgan, 82, Australian rules footballer, equestrian and Olympian.
Steve Pruski, 73, Canadian football player.
Dave Solomon, 84, Fijian-New Zealand rugby player and coach.
Çesk Zadeja, 70, Albanian composer.

16
Yanick Dupré, 24, Canadian ice hockey player, leukemia.
Nusrat Fateh Ali Khan, 48, Pakistani Qawwali musician, heart attack.
Alf Malland, 80, Norwegian actor.
Plum Mariko, 29, Japanese female professional wrestler, wrestling accident.
Jacques Pollet, 75, French racing driver.
Donn Reynolds, 76, Canadian country music singer and yodeler.
Hendrik van den Bergh, 82, South African police official.
Roger Vrigny, 77, French writer.

17
Burnum Burnum, 61, Australian Aboriginal activist, actor, and author, heart disease.
Secondo Magni, 85, Italian racing cyclist.
Don Owens, 65, American gridiron football player.
David Schweitzer, 72, Israeli football player and manager.
Richard Skalak, 74, American biomedical engineering pioneer.

18
Praphas Charusathien, 84, Thai military officer and politician.
Fedor Hanžeković, 84, Croatian film director.
Don Knight, 64, English actor (The Apple Dumpling Gang, Swamp Thing, The Hawaiians), stroke.
Maria Prymachenko, 89, Ukrainian folk art painter.
Frank P. Sanders, 78, American Under Secretary of the Navy (1972–73).
Robert Swenson, 40, American professional wrestler (WCCW) and actor (Batman & Robin, Bulletproof), heart failure.
Harry R. Wellman, 98, American academic.

19
Cathleen Cordell, 82, American actress, emphysema.
Jim Karcher, 83, American gridiron football player.
Robson Lowe, 92, English philatelist, stamp dealer and stamp auctioneer.
Petr Novák, 51, Czech rock musician, poisoned.
Mario Velarde, 57, Mexican football player.

20
Norris Bradbury, 88, American physicist, infectious disease.
William Humphrey, 73, American writer, cancer.
Leo Jaffe, 88, American film executive.
Bob Switzer, 83, American inventor, businessman and environmentalist, Parkinson's disease.

21
Misael Pastrana Borrero, 73, President of Colombia.
Somers Cox, 86, New Zealand rower and Olympian.
Abdul Rahim Ghafoorzai, Afghani politician and diplomat, plane crash.
Jean Horsley, 84, New Zealand artist.
William Jopling, 86, Italian-British leprologist.
Yuri Nikulin, 75, Soviet/Russian actor and clown, heart failure.

22
Prince Álvaro of Orleans, 87, Spanish noble and Infante.
James Edmund Jeffries, 72, American politician.
James K. Johnson, 81, United States Air Force officer.
François Lachenal, 79, Swiss publisher and diplomat.
Eduardo Lopes, 79, Portuguese road and track cyclist, cerebral vascular accident.
Matti Sippala, 89, Finnish athlete.
Robin Skelton, 71, British-Canadian academic, writer, poet, and anthologist.
Mary Louise Smith, 82, American politician and women's rights activist, lung cancer.
Brendan Smyth, 70, Northern Irish Roman Catholic priest and convicted child molester, heart attack.
Virgil Wagner, 75, Canadian football player.
Roy Zimmerman, 79, American gridiron football player.

23
Mike Calhoun, 40, American football player (Chicago Bears, San Francisco 49ers and Tampa Bay Buccaneers).
Eric Gairy, 75, Prime Minister of Grenada (1974–1979).
Buddy Hassett, 85, American baseball player, bone cancer.
Lucy Somerville Howorth, 102, American lawyer, feminist and politician.
John Kendrew, 80, British molecular biologist, recipient of the Nobel Prize in Chemistry.
Elena Mayorova, 39, Soviet and Russian actress, burns.
Jean Poperen, 72, French politician.
Jan Šejna, 70, Czechoslovak Army Major General and defector.

24
Werner Abrolat, 73, German actor.
Davide Ancilotto, 23, Italian basketball player, brain ischemia during game.
Hardial Bains, 58, Indian-Canadian microbiology lecturer and communist politician, cancer.
Rex Ellsworth, 89, American thoroughbred horse breeder.
Louis Essen, 88, English physicist.
Tete Montoliu, 64, Spanish jazz pianist, lung cancer.
Zofia Rydet, 86, Polish photographer.
Edgar F. Shannon, Jr., 79, American university director, cancer.
Luigi Villoresi, 88, Italian motor racing driver.

25
Clodomiro Almeyda, 74, Chilean politician, colon cancer.
Mauro Cristofani, 56, Linguist and researcher in Etruscan studies.
Muriel Frances Dana, 80, American silent film era child actress.
Peter Dews, 67, British stage director.
James Gould, 83, New Zealand rower.
Carl Richard Jacobi, 89, American journalist and author.
Füreya Koral, 87, Turkish ceramics artist.
Noé Murayama, 67, Mexican actor.
Bijan Najdi, 55, Iranian writer and poet.
Robert Pinget, 78, French avant-garde writer.
Camilla Spira, 91, German actress.
Vitaly Tulenev, 60, Soviet and Russian painter, visual artist and art teacher.

26
Marcello Aliprandi, 63, Italian film director.
Hone Glendinning, 85, British cinematographer.
William Kenneth Kiernan, 81, Canadian businessman and politician.
Brendan McCarthy, 52, American football player, heart attack.

27
Sotiria Bellou, 76, Greek singer, cancer.
Sally Blane, 87, American actress, cancer.
Ing Chang-ki, 79, Chinese industrialist and Go player, cancer.
Johannes Edfelt, 92, Swedish writer, poet, and literary critic.
Noël Henderson, 69, Northern Irish rugby player.
James Lindsay, 90, British politician.
Dick N. Lucas, 77, American animator (The Fox and the Hound, One Hundred and One Dalmatians, The Rescuers).
Samuel A. Peeples, 79, American writer, cancer.
Brandon Tartikoff, 48, American television executive, Hodgkin's lymphoma.

28
Frank Bencriscutto, 68, American concert band conductor and composer.
Joyce Ebert, 64, American actress, cancer.
Werner Mieth, 85, American gridiron football player.
Peter Springett, 51, English footballer, cancer.
Masaru Takumi, 61, Japanese yakuza lord, murdered.
Lloyd A. Thompson, 65, Nigerian classicist and academic.

29
Richard Cottam, 72, American political scientist, Iranist and CIA operative.
Osborne Cowles, 98, American basketball player and coach.
Kansari Halder, 86, Indian politician.
Rudolf Pichlmayr, 65, German surgeon.
Nelly Prono, 71, Paraguayan actress, cerebrovascular disease.

30
John D. Craig, 94, American writer, film producer, and television host.
Frunze Dovlatyan, 70, Armenian film director and actor.
Toshiya Fujita, 65, Japanese film director, film actor, and screenwriter, liver failure.
Dale Lewis, 64, American wrestler and Olympian.
Ernst Wilimowski, 81, German–Polish football player.
Veselin Đuranović, 72, Montenegro politician.

31
Will Hare, 81, American actor (Back to the Future, The Rose, Silent Night, Deadly Night), heart attack.
Heinz Kaufmann, 83, German rower.
John M. Leddy, 83, United States Department of State official.
Lotus Weinstock, 54, American stand-up comedian, author, musician, and actress, brain tumor.
People killed in the 1997 Pont de l'Alma car crash:
Diana, Princess of Wales, 36, British royal and activist.
Dodi Fayed, 42, Egyptian film producer (Chariots of Fire, Hook).
Henri Paul, 41, French chauffeur.

References 

1997-08
 08